Vikram Gandhi is an Indian American documentary filmmaker, producer, actor, and journalist. His works included Kumaré (2011), Barry (2016), Trigger Warning with Killer Mike (2019), 69: The Saga of Danny Hernandez (2020).

Biography 
Gandhi was born in New York and grew up in a Hindu household in New Jersey. His parents are Punjabi immigrants from Burma and his father works at the Columbia Presbyterian Hospital. He received his B.A. from Columbia University in 2000.

After college, Gandhi worked as a freelance video journalist and reported on political, economic and human rights issues in Asia for The Economist, Time, ABC and CNN. He also worked as a cinematographer and producer of documentary films and commercials, and his clients included American Express, Energizer, Yahoo and Katy Perry.

As a documentary filmmaker, Gandhi covered the emergence of the yoga industry in the US and, inspired by his own skepticism about religious movements, he started his own fake spiritual movement and called himself "Kumare," which is based on his middle name, Kumar. Impersonating a fake Indian guru, he gained a following in Arizona. He filmed his interactions with his devotees and made the 2011 documentary Kumare, which won the SXSW 2011 Audience Award for Best Documentary and was nominated for a 2011 DOC NYC Viewfinders Grand Jury Prize and a 2013 Cinema Eye Audience Choice Prize.

Vikram joined HBO's Vice as a producer and correspondent in 2012. In 2016, he directed and produced the Barack Obama biopic Barry, which he describes as a "superhero origin story". He also appeared in Batman v Superman: Dawn of Justice as himself. He later produced and directed the Netflix series Trigger Warning with Killer Mike and Grass Is Greener.

In 2020, Gandhi reprised his role as Kumare for the comedy series The Guru Inside You that aired on First Look Media's streaming service Topic. He also directed the Hulu documentary 69: The Saga of Danny Hernandez.

References 

Living people
Year of birth missing (living people)
American documentary filmmakers
Journalists from New Jersey
Columbia College (New York) alumni
American directors
American producers
American male actors of Indian descent